Warm, WARM, or Warmth may refer to:

 A somewhat high temperature
 Kindness

Music
 Warm (The Lettermen album), 1967, and the title song
 Warm (Johnny Mathis album), 1958, and the title song
 Warm (Herb Alpert album), 1969
 Warm (Jeff Tweedy album), 2018
 Warmer (Randy VanWarmer album), 1979
 Warmer (Jeff Tweedy album), 2019
 "Warm", a song by Majid Jordan from Majid Jordan, 2016
 "Warm", a song by Charli XCX featuring Haim from Charli, 2019
 "Warmer", a song by Bea Miller from Chapter Two: Red and Aurora, 2017
 "Warmth", by C418 from Minecraft - Volume Beta, 2013

Other uses
 Warm., taxonomic author abbreviation of Eugenius Warming (1841–1924), Danish botanist
 WARM (foundation), an international foundation working on contemporary conflicts
 WARM (AM), a radio station licensed to Scranton, Pennsylvania, United States
 WARM-FM, a radio station (103.3 FM) licensed to York, Pennsylvania, United States
 Wartime reserve modes (WARM), military procedures held in reserve for wartime or emergency use
 Women's Art Resources of Minnesota, an American women's art organization

See also

 Internal energy
 Enthalpy
 Heat
 Thermal energy
 Climate
 Weather
 Hunt the thimble#Playing with Hot or Cold